This list covers all identifiable locations where United States Army were stationed in Suffolk.

References

United States Army in World War II